A fulmar is a tubenosed seabird of the family Procellariidae/

Fulmar also may refer to:

Aerospace
 Fulmar (rocket), a British rocket
 Aerovision Fulmar, a Spanish unmanned aerial vehicle
 Fairey Fulmar, a British carrier-borne fighter aircraft

Ships
 Fulmar (1868), a ship that sank off the coast of Kilkee, County Clare, Ireland, in 1886
 , a United States Bureau of Fisheries research vessel in commission from 1919 to 1933–1934
 , more than one United States Navy ship
 Fairey Fulmar (yacht), a 20-foot yacht built by Fairey Marine Ltd, sister class to the Fairey Atalanta

Other uses
 Fulmar, a variant of the Frankish name Folmar or Folcmar.
 Fulmar Oil Field, in the North Sea off Scotland, and its Fulmar Alpha (Fulmar A) oil platform
 Fulmar Gas Line, a natural gas pipeline which transports natural gas from the central North Sea to St Fergus, Scotland
 Fulmar Formation, an Upper Jurassic sandstone formation which forms the reservoir within the Fulmar oilfield and other oil fields in the North Sea
RAF Lossiemouth, a military airfield in northeast Scotland formerly known as HMS Fulmar

See also
 Fulmer (disambiguation)